Leptodactylus poecilochilus is a species of frog in the family Leptodactylidae.
It is found in Colombia, Costa Rica, Panama, Venezuela, and possibly Nicaragua.
Its natural habitats are subtropical or tropical dry lowland grassland, subtropical or tropical seasonally wet or flooded lowland grassland, intermittent freshwater lakes, freshwater marshes, intermittent freshwater marshes, pastureland, ponds, and canals and ditches.

References

poecilochilus
Amphibians of Colombia
Amphibians of Costa Rica
Amphibians of Panama
Amphibians of Venezuela
Amphibians described in 1862
Taxonomy articles created by Polbot